The 1977–78 NBA season was the second in the NBA, the 5th in San Antonio, and the 11th as a franchise.  While George Gervin was lighting up the scoreboard with his first point title, the Spurs won the Central Division with a 52–30 record. In the playoffs the Spurs would be stunned in 6 games by the eventual champion Washington Bullets In the series, Gervin averaged 33.2 points per game.

Draft picks

Roster

Regular season
George Gervin and David Thompson of the Denver Nuggets would battle all season for the NBA scoring title. On the final day of the season, Thompson would take the lead by scoring 73 points in an afternoon game against the Detroit Pistons. That night, Gervin needed 58 points against the Jazz in New Orleans. Gervin got to a good start by scoring 20 points in the 1st Quarter. In the 2nd, Gervin set a single period record with 33 points. Early on in the 3rd, Gervin would score his 58 points on the way to 63 points, capturing the scoring title. While Gervin was lighting up the scoreboard, the Spurs won the Central Division with a 52–30 record.

Season Standings

z – clinched division title
y – clinched division title
x – clinched playoff spot

Record vs. opponents

Playoffs

|- align="center" bgcolor="#ccffcc"
| 1
| April 16
| Washington
| W 114–103
| George Gervin (35)
| Larry Kenon (9)
| Gervin, Kenon (5)
| HemisFair Arena9,669
| 1–0
|- align="center" bgcolor="#ffcccc"
| 2
| April 18
| Washington
| L 117–121
| George Gervin (46)
| Larry Kenon (8)
| Larry Kenon (6)
| HemisFair Arena9,871
| 1–1
|- align="center" bgcolor="#ffcccc"
| 3
| April 21
| @ Washington
| L 105–118
| George Gervin (33)
| Larry Kenon (9)
| Larry Kenon (4)
| Capital Centre17,417
| 2–1
|- align="center" bgcolor="#ffcccc"
| 4
| April 23
| @ Washington
| L 95–98
| George Gervin (35)
| Billy Paultz (8)
| Mike Gale (7)
| Capital Centre13,459
| 3–1
|- align="center" bgcolor="#ccffcc"
| 5
| April 25
| Washington
| W 116–105
| George Gervin (27)
| Larry Kenon (14)
| Louie Dampier (6)
| HemisFair Arena9,709
| 3–2
|- align="center" bgcolor="#ffcccc"
| 6
| April 28
| @ Washington
| L 100–103
| Mark Olberding (24)
| Green, Paultz (9)
| Mike Gale (9)
| Capital Centre19,035
| 4–2
|-

Awards and honors
George Gervin, All-NBA First Team

References

Spurs on Basketball Reference

San Antonio Spurs seasons
San Antonio
San Antonio
San Antonio